Howard Earle "Twink" Twining (May 30, 1894 – June 14, 1973), nicknamed "Doc", was an American pitcher who played in Major League Baseball but only for one game in his entire career: on July 6, 1916, with the Cincinnati Reds. Twining was born in Horsham, Pennsylvania and died in Lansdale, Pennsylvania.

External links
Baseball-Reference.com

1894 births
1973 deaths
Cincinnati Reds players
Baseball players from Pennsylvania
Swarthmore Garnet Tide baseball players